Euryoryzomys is a genus of rodents in the tribe Oryzomyini of family Cricetidae. It includes six species, which are distributed in South America. Until 2006, its members were included in the genus Oryzomys, but they are not closely related to the type species of that genus, and therefore they were placed in a new genus. They are most closely related to genera like Hylaeamys and Transandinomys; many members of these genera were previously placed in a single species, known as Oryzomys capito. The genus name, Euryoryzomys, combines the name "Oryzomys" with the Ancient Greek word eurus "broad", referring to the broad range in distribution of the genus.

It includes the following species:
 Euryoryzomys emmonsae (Musser, Carleton, Brothers & Gardner, 1998)
 Euryoryzomys lamia (Thomas, 1901)
 Euryoryzomys legatus (Thomas, 1925)
 Euryoryzomys macconnelli (Thomas, 1910)
 Euryoryzomys nitidus (Thomas, 1884)
 Euryoryzomys russatus (Wagner, 1848)

Literature cited
Musser, G.G. and Carleton, M.D. 2005. Superfamily Muroidea. Pp. 894–1531 in Wilson, D.E. and Reeder, D.M. (eds.). Mammal Species of the World: a taxonomic and geographic reference. 3rd ed. Baltimore: The Johns Hopkins University Press, 2 vols., 2142 pp. 

 
Rodent genera
Taxa named by Marcelo Weksler
Taxa named by Alexandre Reis Percequillo